Minivalva is a genus of moth in the family Cosmopterigidae. It contains only one species, Minivalva kondarella, which is found in Tajikistan.

References

Cosmopterigidae